F. Hoffmann-La Roche AG, commonly known as Roche, is a Swiss multinational healthcare company that operates worldwide under two divisions: Pharmaceuticals and Diagnostics. Its holding company, Roche Holding AG, has shares listed on the SIX Swiss Exchange. The company headquarters are located in Basel. 
Roche is the fifth largest pharmaceutical company in the world by revenue, and the leading provider of cancer treatments globally.

The company controls the American biotechnology company Genentech, which is a wholly owned affiliate, and the Japanese biotechnology company Chugai Pharmaceuticals, as well as the United States-based companies Ventana and Foundation Medicine. Roche's revenues during fiscal year 2020, were 58.32 billion Swiss francs. Descendants of the founding Hoffmann and Oeri families own slightly over half of the bearer shares with voting rights (a pool of family shareholders 45%, and Maja Oeri a further 5% apart), with Swiss pharma firm Novartis owning a further third of its shares until 2021. Roche is one of the few companies increasing their dividend every year, for 2020 as the 34th consecutive year.

F. Hoffmann-La Roche is a full member of the European Federation of Pharmaceutical Industries and Associations (EFPIA).

History
Founded in 1896 by Fritz Hoffmann-La Roche, the company was early on known for producing various vitamin preparations and derivatives. In 1934, it became the first company to mass-produce synthetic vitamin C, under the brand name Redoxon. During the Second World War Roche collaborated with the Nazi regime in Germany and used forced labour in its German and Polish based factories.  In 1957, it introduced the class of tranquilizers known as benzodiazepines (with Valium and Rohypnol being the best known members). It manufactures and sells several cancer drugs and is a leader in this field. In 1956, the first antidepressant, iproniazid, was accidentally created during an experiment while synthesizing isoniazid. Originally, it had been intended to create a more efficient drug at combatting Tuberculosis. Iproniazid, however, revealed to have its own benefits; some people felt it made them feel happier. It was withdrawn from the market in the early 1960s, due to toxic side-effects.

In 1976, an accident at a chemical factory in Seveso, Italy, owned by a subsidiary of Roche, caused a large dioxin contamination. In 1982, the United States arm of the company acquired Biomedical Reference Laboratories for US$163.5 million. That company dated from the late 1960s, and was located in Burlington, North Carolina. That year Hoffmann-La Roche then merged it with all of its laboratories, and incorporated the merged company as Roche Biomedical Laboratories, Inc. in Burlington. By the early 1990s, Roche Biomedical became one of the largest clinical laboratory networks in the United States, with 20 major laboratories and US$600 million in sales.

Roche has also produced various HIV tests and antiretroviral drugs. It bought the patents for the polymerase chain reaction (PCR) technique in 1992. In 1995, the era of highly active anti-retroviral therapy (HAART) was initiated by the United States FDA's approval of Hoffman LaRoche's HIV protease inhibitor saquinavir. Within 2 years of its approval (and that of ritonavir 4 months later) annual deaths from AIDS in the United States fell from over 50,000 to approximately 18,000  On 28 April 1995, Hoffmann-La Roche sold Roche Biomedical Laboratories, Inc. to National Health Laboratories Holdings Inc. (which then changed its name to Laboratory Corporation of America Holdings). Roche acquired Syntex in 1994, and Chugai Pharmaceuticals in 2002.

Oseltamivir an antiviral drug used to combat influenza. Roche is the only drug company authorized to manufacture the drug, which was discovered by Gilead Sciences.  Roche purchased the rights to the drug in 1996, and in 2005, settled a royalty dispute, agreeing to pay Gilead tiered royalties of 14–22% of annual net sales without adjusting the payments for manufacturing costs, as had been allowed in the original licensing agreement.

On 20 October 2005, Hoffmann-La Roche decided to license other companies to manufacture Oseltamivir.

Also in 2005, Roche acquired the Swiss company GlycArt Biotechnology in order to acquire technology to afucosylate antibodies; one of its products in development was obinutuzumab, which gained FDA approval in November 2013 for the treatment of chronic lymphocytic leukemia.

On 22 January 2008, Roche acquired Ventana Medical Systems for $3.4 billion. On 2 January 2009,  Roche acquired Memory Pharmaceuticals Corp.

On 26 March 2009, Roche acquired Genentech for $46.8 billion. On 12 March 2009, Roche agreed to fully acquire Genentech, in which it had held a majority stake since 1990, after eight months of negotiations. As a result of the Genentech acquisition, Roche moved its Palo Alto based research facilities to their campus that straddles the border between Clifton, New Jersey and Nutley, New Jersey while Roche's United States headquarters, located on the New Jersey site since 1929, was moved to Genentech's facility in South San Francisco. Genentech became a wholly owned subsidiary group of Roche on 25 March 2009. Roche began vacating the NJ site in 2012, and sold it off in 2016.

Roche acquired Medingo Ltd. in April 2010, for $160 million and BioImagene, Inc. in August for $100 million.

In 2011, the company received the International Society for Pharmaceutical Engineering Facility of the Year Award for Process Innovation for Roche's "MyDose" Clinical Supply project. In March 2011, Roche acquired PVT Probenverteiltechnik GmbH for up to €85 million. In July 2010, Roche acquired mtm laboratories AG for up to 190 million EUR. On October, Roche acquired Anadys Pharmaceuticals, Inc. for $230 million. In December, Roche announced it would acquire Munich-based Verum Diagnostica GmbH, gaining entry to the fastest-growing field in the coagulation diagnostics market.

On 26 June 2012, Roche announced the closure of the Nutley/Clifton campus, which was completed in 2013. The property is in the process of remediation.

In July 2013, Roche Diagnostics acquired blood diagnostics company Constitution Medical Inc. for $220 million. Later, in September, Genentech announced it would acquire Arrayit Corporation.

On 7 April 2014, Roche announced its intention to acquire IQuum for up to $450 million, as well as the rights to an experimental drug (ORY-1001) from Spanish company Oryzon Genomics for $21 million and up to $500 million in milestone payments. On 2 June, Roche announced its intention to acquire Genia Technologies Inc. for up to $350 million. In August 2014, the company agreed to purchase Californian-based pharmaceutical firm InterMune for $8.3 billion, at $74 a share this represents a 38% premium over the final share closing price, as well as Santaris Pharma A/S for $450 million. In December 2014, the company acquired next-generation sequencing processing company Bina Technologies for an undisclosed sum and Dutalys GmbH a developer of next-generation anti-bodies.

On 16 January 2015, the company announced that they would acquire Trophos for €470 million ($543 million) in order to increase the company's neuromuscular disease presence. The deal will centre on the Phase II and III spinal muscular atrophy drug olesoxime (TRO19622). In April 2015, Roche acquired CAPP Medical, and its chief development of technology for cancer screening and monitoring via the detection of circulating tumour DNA.

In August, the company announced its intention to acquire GeneWEAVE, Inc. for up to $425 million in order to strengthen its microbial diagnostics business. Days later the company acquired Kapa Biosystems, Inc. for $445M, focussing on next generation sequencing and polymerase chain reaction applications. In October 2015, the company acquired Adheron Therapeutics for $105 million (plus up to $475 million in milestone payments).

In January 2016, the company announced it would acquire Tensha Therapeutics for $115 million upfront, with $420 million in contingent payments.

In January 2017, the company acquired ForSight VISION4. In June, the company acquired the diabetes management platform, mySugr GmbH for an undisclosed price. In November Roche acquired Viewics, Inc. In late December the company announced it would acquire Ignyta Inc, expanding its global oncology business.

In February 2018, Roche announced it would acquire Flatiron Health, a business specialising in US cancer data analytics, for $1.9 billion. In June of the same year the company announced it would acquire the outstanding shares of Foundation Medicine for $2.4 billion ($137 per share). Later in September Roche announced its intention to acquire Tusk Therapeutics for up to €655 million ($759 million) expanding Roche's oncology pipeline. Tusk announced that the anti-CD38 antibody it is developing will be spun off to form a new company, Black Belt Therapeutics. In late November, the company announced that Genentech would acquire Jecure Therapeutics, gaining access to Jecure's portfolio of NLRP3 inhibitors developed to fight inflammatory diseases like non-alcoholic steatohepatitis and liver fibrosis.

The offer to acquire Spark Therapeutics was extended to May 2019 after Roche was unable to garner majority support from Spark shareholders. A second gene therapy-related action came in December with the  acquisition of non-United States rights to an investigational duchenne muscular dystrophy gene therapy developed by Sarepta Therapeutics. In November, Roche acquired Promedior and its lead treatment – PRM-151 – for the treatment of idiopathic pulmonary fibrosis, for $390 million upfront and another $1 billion in milestone payments.

In March 2020, the Roche Diagnostics division reached a significant milestone with the FDA-approval of its high-volume Sars-CoV-2 diagnostic test, capable of analysing 1,400-8,800 samples within 24h on the proprietary Cobas 6800/8800 molecular testing system. In May the company announced it had acquired US-based Stratos Genomics for an undisclosed amount. In September, the business acquired Ireland-based Inflazome, for €380 million, gaining control of  its NLRP3 inflammasome inhibitors.

In March 2021, Roche announced it would acquire GenMark Diagnostics for $1.8 billion. Under the terms of agreement, Genmark  diagnostics will become a subsidiary and the principal operations will continue to remain in Carlsbad, California. In September, the company announced it would acquire German biotech group, TIB Molbiol, enhancing its molecular diagnostics operations.

Family 

The Hoffmann-La Roche family is Switzerland's richest and one of the most secretive families. Many members of the family don't carry the last name Hoffmann anymore. Some are known as Oeri, Michalksi, Faber-Castell, Fabre, Schmid or Duschmalé.

Acquisition history

Hoffmann-La Roche (Founded 1896 by Fritz Hoffmann-La Roche)
Biomedical Reference Laboratories (Acq 1982, restructured into Roche Biomedical Laboratories, Inc in 1982, sold 1995)
Syntex (Acq 1994)
Chugai Pharmaceuticals (Acq 2002)
454 Life Sciences (Acq 2007)
Roche Diagnostics
Spring BioScience Corp (Acq 2007)
Ventana Medical Systems (Acq 2009)
mySugr GmbH (Acq 2017)
Viewics, Inc (Acq 2017)
Flatiron Health (Acq 2018)
Stratos Genomics (Acq 2020)
Memory Pharmaceuticals Corp (Acq 2009)
Genentech (Acq 2009)
Tanox, Inc (Acq 2006)
Arrayit Corporation (Acq 2013)
Seragon (Acq 2014)
Jecure Therapeutics (Acq 2018)
Medingo Ltd (Acq 2010)
BioImagene, Inc. (Acq 2010)
PVT Probenverteiltechnik GmbH (Acq 2010)
MTM laboratories AG (Acq 2010)
Anadys Pharmaceuticals, Inc. (Acq 2010) 
Verum Diagnostica GmbH (Acq 2011)
Constitution Medical Inc. (Acq 2012)
IQuum (Acq 2014)
Genia Technologies Inc. (Acq 2014)
InterMune (Acq 2014)
Santaris Pharma A/S  (Acq 2014)
Bina Technologies, Inc. (Acq 2014)
Dutalys GmbH (Acq 2014)
Ariosa Diagnostics (Acq 2014)
Trophos (Acq 2015)
CAPP Medical (Acq 2015)
GeneWEAVE BioSciences, Inc. (Acq 2015)
Kapa Biosystems, Inc. (Acq 2015)
Adheron Therapeutics (Acq 2015)
Tensha Therapeutics (Acq 2016)
ForSight VISION4 (Acq 2017)
Ignyta Inc (Acq 2017)
Foundation Medicine, Inc.  (Acq 2018)
Tusk Therapeutics (Acq 2018)
Spark Therapeutics (Acq 2019)
Promedior (Acq 2019)
Stratos Genomics (Acq 2020)
Inflazome (Acq 2020)
GenMark Diagnostics (Acq 2021)
TIB Molbiol (Acq 2021)

Financial data

Divisions

Roche has two major divisions: Pharmaceuticals and Diagnostics.

Roche Diagnostics manufactures diagnostic equipment and reagents for research and medical diagnostic applications. Internally, it is organised into five major business areas: Roche Applied Science, Roche Professional Diagnostics, Roche Diabetes Care, Roche Molecular Diagnostics and Roche Tissue Diagnostics (Ventana). The main location for Roche Professional Diagnostics is in Rotkreuz, Switzerland.

All business areas except Roche Applied Science focus on health care applications, targeting either physicians, hospitals and clinics, or consumers. Applied Science targets research settings in academia and pharmaceutical and biotechnology industries.

Products

Hoffmann-La Roche develops drugs used for cancer treatment, against virus diseases and for treatment of metabolic diseases. The company is the world's largest spender in pharmaceutical R&D.

Drugs produced by Roche include:
Accutane/RoAccutane (isotretinoin), for severe (nodular) acne vulgaris - no longer sold under Accutane brand name but is still available as RoAccutane, other brand names and Isotretinoin generics.
Actemra/RoActemra (tocilizumab), for rheumatoid arthritis.
Actimmune (interferon gamma), for chronic granulomatous disease, later sold to Connetics Corporation, then InterMune, after that Vidara Therapeutics and finally Horizon Pharma as of 2019.
Activase (alteplase), for heart attacks.
Akynzeo (netupitant/palonosetron), for nausea and vomiting, licensed by Eisai Co. and Helsinn Therapeutics.
Alecensa (alectinib), for ALK-positive non-small cell lung cancer.
Aloxi (palonosetron), for nausea and vomiting, licensed by Eisai Co. and Helsinn Therapeutics.
Anexate (flumazenil), for the reversal of acute benzodiazepine effects.
Aurorix (moclobemide), for depression.
Avastin (bevacizumab), for certain malignant tumours.
Bactrim (trimethoprim/sulfamethoxazole), a sulphonamide antibacterial.
Boniva/Bonviva (ibandronic acid), for the treatment of osteoporosis in postmenopausal women.
Camleed (enprostil), for gastric ulcer prevention.
Cardene (nicardipine), for treatment of stable angina pectoris.
Cathflo Activase (alteplase), for heart attacks.
Cellcept (mycophenolate mofetil), for transplant rejection.
Cotellic (cobimetinib), for melanoma.
Cymevene (ganciclovir), for cytomegalovirus infection.
Dalmane/Dalmadorm (flurazepam), for insomnia.
Dilatrend (carvedilol), for hypertension and congestive heart failure.
Dormicum (midazolam), for insomnia and procedural sedation and analgesia.
Erivedge (vismodegib), for basal-cell carcinoma.
Esbriet (pirfenidone), for idiopathic pulmonary fibrosis.
Fansidar (sulfadoxine/pyrimethamine), for malaria and toxoplasmosis.
Fuzeon (enfuvirtide), for salvage therapy of HIV-1 infection.
Gazyva (obinutuzumab), for chronic lymphocytic leukaemia.
Hemlibra (emicizumab), for haemophilia A.
Herceptin (trastuzumab), for HER-2 positive breast cancer.
Hivid (zalcitabine), for HIV-1 infection, later discontinued in 2006.
Inhibace (cilazapril), for hypertension and congestive heart failure.
Invirase (saquinavir), for HIV-1 infection.
Kadcyla (trastuzumab emtansine), for HER-2 positive breast cancer.
Klonopin/Rivotril (clonazepam), for epilepsy and anxiety disorders.
Kytril (granisetron), for chemotherapy-induced nausea and vomiting, licensed by GlaxoSmithKline.
Lariam (mefloquine), for malaria (both prevention and treatment).
Lexotanil (bromazepam), for anxiety disorders.
Librax (Chlordiazepoxide/clidinium bromide), treating stomach ulcers, irritable bowel syndrome, or symptoms related to intestinal infection.
Librium (chlordiazepoxide), for anxiety disorders.
Lucentis (ranibizumab), for wet age-related macular degeneration (AMD).
Luxturna (voretigene neparvovec), for Leber's congenital amaurosis.
MabThera (rituximab), for B-cell chronic lymphocytic leukaemia (and other haematological malignancies), non-Hodgkin lymphomas and rheumatoid arthritis.
Madopar/Prolopa (levodopa/benserazide), for Parkinson's disease.
Mircera (methoxy polyethylene glycol-epoetin beta), for anaemia associated with chronic kidney disease.
Naprosyn (naproxen), an NSAID used for pain relief and arthritis treatment.
Neulastim (pegfilgrastim), for neutropaenia.
Neupogen (filgrastim), for neutropaenia.
Nutropin (somatropin), for growth hormone deficiency.
Nutropin AQ (somatropin), for growth hormone deficiency.
Nutropin Depot (somatropin), for growth hormone deficiency, later discontinued in 2004 and replaced by Nutropin AQ.
Ocrevus (ocrelizumab), for MS.
Pegasys, (peginterferon alfa-2a) for hepatitis B and C.
Perjeta (pertuzumab), for HER-2 positive breast cancer.
Polivy (polatuzumab vedotin), for diffuse large B-cell lymphoma.
Protropin (somatrem), for growth hormone deficiency, later discontinued in 2004 in favor of its successor, Nutropin.
Pulmozyme (dornase alfa), for the improvement of pulmonary function in cystic fibrosis.
Raptiva (efalizumab), for psoriasis, later withdrawn in 2009 due to the risk of PML.
Recormon/NeoRecormon (epoetin beta), for anaemia.
Rituxan (rituximab), for non-Hodgkin's lymphoma.
Rocaltrol (calcitriol), for osteoporosis and hypocalcaemia.
Rocephin (ceftriaxone), a broad-spectrum cephalosporin antibiotic.
Roferon A (peginterferon alfa-2a), for some haematological malignancies (hairy cell leukaemia, chronic myelogenous leukaemia), certain solid tumours (including Kaposi's sarcoma), genital warts and chronic hepatitis C.
Rohypnol (flunitrazepam), for severe insomnia.
Rozlytrek (entrectinib), for ROS1-positive non-small cell lung cancer and NTRK fusion-positive solid tumours.
Soriatane/Neotigason (acitretin), for psoriasis.
Tamiflu (oseltamivir), for influenza A and B (both treatment and prevention).
Tarceva (erlotinib), for various cancers.
Tasmar (tolcapone), for parkinson's disease, licensed by Mylan and Bausch Health.
Tecentriq (atezolizumab), for non-small cell lung cancer.
TNKase (tenecteplase), for heart attacks.
Toradol (ketorolac), for pain management.
Valcyte (valganciclovir), for cytomegalovirus infection.
Valium (diazepam), for anxiety disorders, alcohol withdrawal, status epilepticus and other conditions.
Venclexta (venetoclax), for chronic lymphocytic leukaemia.
Versed (midazolam), for insomnia and procedural sedation and analgesia.
Vesanoid (tretinoin), for acute promyelocytic leukaemia.
Viracept (nelfinavir), for HIV-1 infection, licensed by Pfizer and ViiV Healthcare.
Xeloda (capecitabine), for breast and colorectal cancer.
Xenical (orlistat), for obesity.
Xofluza (baloxavir marboxil), for influenza A and B (both treatment and prevention).
Xolair (omalizumab), for asthma.
Zelboraf (vemurafenib), for late-stage V600E BRAF mutation-positive melanoma.
Zenapax (daclizumab), for the prevention of acute transplant rejection.

Diabetes management products produced by Roche under the Accu-Chek brand include Accu-Chek Mobile, Accu-Chek Aviva, Accu-Chek Compact Plus, Accu-Chek Aviva Expert, Accu-Chek Active, Accu-Chek Advantage, Accu-Chek Performa, Accu-Chek Aviva Nano, Accu-Chek Performa Nano blood glucose monitors. Accu-Chek Spirit and Accu-Chek Combo insulin pumps. Accu-Chek 360 and SmartPix diabetes management software.

Other products include:

Cobas Mira

Price-fixing conspiracy 

Stanley Adams, Roche's World Product Manager in Basel, contacted the European Economic Community in 1973 with evidence that Roche had been breaking antitrust laws, engaging in price fixing and market sharing for vitamins with its competitors. Roche was fined accordingly, but a bungle on the part of the EEC allowed the company to discover that it was Adams who had blown the whistle. He was arrested for unauthorised disclosure — an offence under Swiss law — and imprisoned. His wife, having learnt that he might face decades in jail, committed suicide.

In 1999 the firm pleaded guilty to participation in a worldwide conspiracy to raise and fix prices for vitamins sold in the US and globally.  Hoffmann-La Roche paid $500 million in criminal fines to the United States.

Collaborative research
In addition to internal research and development activities F. Hoffmann-La Roche is also involved in publicly funded collaborative research projects, with other industrial and academic partners. One example in the area of non-clinical safety assessment is the InnoMed PredTox. The company is expanding its activities in joint research projects within the framework of the Innovative Medicines Initiative of EFPIA and the European Commission.

See also
 List of pharmaceutical companies
 Pharmaceutical industry in Switzerland

References

Further reading
 Hans Conrad Peyer (1996) Roche – A Company History 1896–1996  Basel: Editiones Roche

External links

 
 Roche Diagnostics

 
Multinational companies headquartered in Switzerland
Price fixing convictions
Pharmaceutical companies of Switzerland
Pharmaceutical companies established in 1896
Orphan drug companies
Life sciences industry
Swiss brands
Companies listed on the SIX Swiss Exchange